Aatos is a Finnish masculine given name. People with the name are as follows:

Given name
 Aatos Erkko (1932–2012), Finnish journalist and businessman
 Aatos Hirvisalo (1915–1992), Finnish sailor
 Aatos Jaskari (1904–1962), Finnish wrestler 
 Aatos Lehtonen (1914–2005), Finnish football player
 Aatos Tapala (born 1940), Finnish actor and opera singer

Middle name
 Jalo Aatos Fred (1917–2003), Finnish chess player
 Pentti Aatos Kahma (born 1943), Finnish discus thrower

Others
 Aatos Punanen, stage name of Jan Erola

Finnish masculine given names